The AN/SPG-51 is an American tracking / illumination fire-control radar for RIM-24 Tartar and RIM-66 Standard missiles. It is used for target tracking and Surface-to-air missile guidance as part of the Mk. 73 gun and missile director system, which is part of the Tartar Guided Missile Fire Control System.

Aircraft tracking is based on monopulse radar utilizing Pulse-Doppler radar signal processing in MK 74 MOD 14 and MK 74 MOD 15. The MK 74 MOD 15 configuration includes continuous-wave radar tracking in addition to pulse-Doppler tracking. It provides illumination for bistatic radar operation associated with missile guidance in all configurations. Older systems rely on conical scanning rather than monopulse.

Platforms

(Du Chayla subclass post AAW modernization)













(DDG conversion with Tartar)

Variants
 SPG-51: Original Model.
 SPG-51B: Upgraded SPG-51 designed for use with Improved Tartar (IT) missile.
 SPG-51C: Automatic acquisition and tracking, increased reliability, and improved ECCM capabilities, clutter rejection, and multiple target resolution.
 SPG-51D: Klystron replaced with traveling-wave tube to permit the transmission to be chosen from a much wider bandwidth. Increased use of integrated circuitry and digital circuitry.
 SPG-51E: Proposed "universal fire control radar" capable of controlling the RIM-8 Talos as well as Tartar. Not built in quantity.

References

Notes

External links
MK-74 Guided Missile Fire Control System (GMFCS)
AN/SPG-51D Missile Director Radar

Sea radars
Military electronics of the United States